Tomas Totland (born 28 September 1999) is a Norwegian football defender who plays as a left back for Häcken.

He started his career in Fana, playing on the senior team in from 2015 before joining Sogndal in the winter of 2017. He was loaned back to Fana until the summer of 2017. The same year he became a Norway youth international player. In 2021 Totland went on to Tromsø IL and made his Eliteserien debut in May 2021 against Bodø/Glimt.

Honours 
BK Häcken

 Allsvenskan: 2022

References

1999 births
Living people
Footballers from Bergen
Norwegian footballers
Fana IL players
Sogndal Fotball players
Tromsø IL players
BK Häcken players
Norwegian First Division players
Eliteserien players
Association football defenders
Norway youth international footballers
Norway under-21 international footballers
Norwegian expatriate footballers
Expatriate footballers in Sweden
Norwegian expatriate sportspeople in Sweden